Carlos W. Elmenhorst, by birth Kurt Wolfram Carlos Elmenhorst, (* 6. April 1910 in Kiel; † 24. October 2000 in Guatemala City) was a German merchant, Maya scientist, and collector of Maya textiles.

Life 
Carlos W. Elmenhorst was the eldest son of five children of an old Hamburg merchant family. After an apprenticeship with Eduard Ringel & Co im- and exports in Hamburg, a merchant firm specialised in coffee, he decided to leave Germany 1932 for Guatemala, where he was more than 60 years active in the coffee trade business, first from 1933 to 1944 with Nottebohm Hermanos (Gebrüder Nottebohm), later in his own company. Apart from his business as merchant he collected since the 1930s  systematically textiles of all Mayas populations in Guatemala, thus assembling one of the most complete collections of Maya textiles in the world.

He donated his collection of more than 1,000 items in 1989 to the Hamburg Museum für Völkerkunde Hamburg, which is showing it since 2011 as Sammlung Elmenhorst in the permanent exhibition.

His library with an abundant collection of antiquarian autographs and contemporary travel and expedition reports about Central America in the 16th century he bequeathed as  Carlos Elmenhorst Collection to the Ludwig von Mises library of the Francisco-Marroquín-University in Guatemala City. It is currently being digitalised and will be published online.

External links 
 http://www.abendblatt.de/kultur-live/article1741047/Fuer-ein-paar-Stunden-nach-Suedamerika.html
 http://www.voelkerkundemuseum.com/302-0-Elmenhorst.html Sammlung Elmenhorst in the Museum für Völkerkunde Hamburg
 http://www.imcos.ufm.edu/ufm/UfmMapDiv.asp Carlos Elmenhorst Collection in the Francisco-Marroquín-University in Guatemala-City

1910 births
2000 deaths
People from Guatemala City
German emigrants to Guatemala
Businesspeople from Hamburg
Guatemalan scientists